Holland's sportive lemur (Lepilemur hollandorum), or the Mananara-Nord sportive lemur, is a sportive lemur that is endemic to Madagascar.  It is one of 26 species in the genus Lepilemur. This lemur is found specifically in the Mananara-Nord Biosphere Reserve, but the limits of its habitat have yet to be determined.  It lives in primary and secondary rainforests.  Holland's sportive lemur was described in 2009.

Description
This species of sportive lemur weighs . It is closest in weight to the weasel sportive lemur.

The pelage on the head, along the shoulders down to the mid back is mottled reddish-gray. The color of its coat then becomes 
a lighter grayish-brown down to the pygal region of the tail.

References

Sportive lemurs
Mammals described in 2009